Frances L. Janssen [″Big Red″, or ″Little Red″] (January 25, 1926 – November 27, 2008) was an American pitcher who played from  through  in the All-American Girls Professional Baseball League.

The tall, red-haired Frances Janssen was a well-travelled pitcher during her five-year career in the AAGPBL, as she moved constantly from one city to another because the league office shifted players to help teams stay competitive. Janssen also was cut twice from the league, but she kept playing for seven different teams without complaint, even if from different periods of time and different stays.

Born in Remington, Indiana, Frances was the daughter of Fred and Anna (née Petersen) Janssen, who emigrated from Germany in the mid-1910s and settled in the farmlands of Indiana. She had a brother, Paul, and four sisters, Betty, Tinie, Wilma and Anna. Almost six feet tall, Frances played basketball and organized softball while attending Gilboa High School. She later received an associate degree in business from South Bend IUPUI and attended International Business College of Fort Wayne. She graduated in 1944 and immediately went to work in an office.

By the time, several girls from her local softball team had been scouted and signed by the league. Frances gave it a tryout in 1946 but she did not make the grade. She then insisted again in 1948 and was accepted. After spring training, she was assigned to the South Bend Blue Sox for a couple of days before being sent to the Grand Rapids Chicks. She went 4–4 with a 3.98 earned run average in 11 games and was released after one month of action. I got released because I couldn't throw a curveball, she recalled in an interview.But Janssen did not give up, and accepted a demotion to the Chicago Colleens/Springfield Sallies rookie touring teams to work things out. The Colleens and the Sallies had lost their franchises after their poor performance the previous year. Both teams played exhibition games against each other as they travelled primarily through the South and East, traveling through 20 states and played in 46 cities. We traveled more than 10,000 miles in 1949 from Illinois to Texas, across the Gulf states and up to New Jersey and Pennsylvania, she later explained in an interview with Jim Sargent for the Society for American Baseball Research. We played in minor league parks in Tulsa and Baltimore, as well as in city parks, and we drew good crowds.

In two of those games, she was asked to switch to the Sallies and serve as playing manager as well as chaperone. She handled both jobs well while also leading her Colleens team in pitching. By the way, she came along fine and hurled two one-hitter shutouts against Springfield at Oklahoma and South Carolina ballparks. She finished the tour with a 16–6 record in 23 pitching appearances. Nevertheless, since the league counted the whole tour as exhibition games, no official statistics were kept.

Janssen was promoted to the Peoria Redwings in 1950 and ended up pitching for the Fort Wayne Daisies in the postseason. She went 3–3 with a 3.87 ERA in 19 games for Peoria and Fort Wayne, and pitched 12 innings of shutout ball without a decision in three playoff games, even though the Daisies lost to the Rockford Peaches in the best-of-seven final round.

She opened the 1951 season with Fort Wayne and returned to Peoria early in the year, which made her feel like the end of the world, according to her own words. Then she was sent to the Kalamazoo Lassies during the midseason and finished the year with the Battle Creek Belles. Through her lengthy and arduous journey, Janssen posted a career-best 26 games pitched, only six behind Belles teammate Migdalia Pérez, while also setting career-highs in ERA (2.67), innings pitched (145) and strikeouts (43). She had a very good season overall, although this was not reflected in her 6–10 losing record.

Janssen spent the entire 1952 season with Battle Creek and was used in relief duties, a seldom used role in the league. She appeared in only five games, going 0–1 with a 5.00 ERA in 18 innings of work.

Following her baseball days, Janssen played center for the South Bend Rockettes women's basketball team and volleyball with the South Bend Turners for more than a decade. She helped the Rockettes win five national championships and won a national champion title with the Turners. She also was an insurance representative for Laven Insurance Company in South Bend during 25 years and retired in 1991.

Besides this, she became an avid golfer and attended AAGPBL Players Association reunions. In addition, she helped the association research information for the league's archives at the Northern Indiana Historical Society, of which she was an active member. The association was largely responsible for the opening of Women in Baseball, a permanent display at the Baseball Hall of Fame and Museum in Cooperstown, New York, which was unveiled in 1988 to honor the entire All-American Girls Professional Baseball League.

Frances Janssen spent her entire life in her home state of Indiana. After moving from her native Remington to South Bend, she lived in Lafayette, where she died of natural causes in 2008 at the age of 82.

Career statistics
Pitching

Batting 

Fielding

References

All-American Girls Professional Baseball League players
South Bend Blue Sox players
Grand Rapids Chicks players
Chicago Colleens players
Peoria Redwings players
Kalamazoo Lassies players
Fort Wayne Daisies players
Battle Creek Belles players
American people of German-Jewish descent
Baseball players from South Bend, Indiana
Indiana University–Purdue University Indianapolis alumni
People from Remington, Indiana
1926 births
2008 deaths
20th-century American women
20th-century American people
21st-century American women